Mackey is an Irish and Scottish surname.  It can also be used as a given name.

Notable people with the name include:

Surname
 Albert Mackey (1807–1881), writer on freemasonry
 Amanda Mackey (1951–2022), American casting director
 Bill Mackey (1927–1951), race car driver
 Biz Mackey (1897–1965), American Negro league baseball player and manager
 Bobby Mackey, country music singer
 Clay Mackey, Washington viticulturist 
 Connor Mackey (born 1996), American ice hockey player
 Crandal Mackey (1865–1957), American lawyer and newspaper publisher
 Dick Mackey, dogsled racer
 Edmund William McGregor Mackey (1846–1884), U.S. Representative from South Carolina
 Emma Mackey (born 1996), French-British actress
 Gerry Mackey Irish football player (born 1933)
 George Mackey (1916–2006), mathematician
 Greg Mackey (1961–2014), Australian rugby league footballer
 Hayley Mackey (born 2001), is a New Zealand judoka
 Jack Mackey (1922–1945), Australian recipient of the Victoria Cross
 James Mackey (born 1986), poker player
 Janet Mackey (born 1953), politician
 Jermain Mackey (born 1979), Bahamian boxer of the 2000s and 2010s 
 John Mackey (disambiguation), multiple people
 Kevin Mackey (born 1946), basketball coach
 Kyle Mackey (born 1962), American football player
 Lance Mackey (1970–2022), dogsled racer
 Levi A. Mackey (1819–1889), 19th century politician
 Malcolm Mackey (born 1970), basketball player
 Mick Mackey (1912–1982), hurler
 Moana Mackey (born 1974), politician
 Nathaniel Mackey (born 1947), American writer
 Nick Mackey, politician
 Sandra Mackey (c. 1930–2015), expert on Middle East
 Steve Mackey (born 1966), musician
 Steven Mackey (born 1956), composer
 Wade Clark Mackey (born 1946), American author and social scientist
 William Mackey (Jesuit) (1915–1995), Canadian Jesuit Educationist and founder of the modern educational system of Bhutan

Given name
 Mackey Sasser (born 1962), American former Major League Baseball player
 Mackey Saturday (born 1985), American designer and typographer

Fictional characters
 Vic Mackey, main character of the FX drama series The Shield
 Mr. Mackey, on the animated series South Park